The Hofstra Pride football (formerly the Hofstra Flying Dutchmen) program was the intercollegiate American football team for Hofstra University, located on Long Island in Hempstead, New York. Hofstra competed in the NCAA Division I Football Championship Subdivision (FCS) and were members of the Colonial Athletic Association. Its first football team was fielded in 1937, and the program compiled a  record through 2009.

The nickname changed to Pride in 2000; following the 2009 season on December 3, the university announced the termination of the football program. Under NCAA rules, football players could transfer to other schools and play immediately, without a waiting period, and scholarship-holders who wished to stay at Hofstra were permitted to keep their scholarships.

Funds previously used for the football program went into the creation of the medical school, and enhanced a variety of programs, including public health, hard sciences, and engineering.

Retired numbers
 Doug Shanahan (#26)
 Marques Colston (#89)
 Willie Colon (#77)
 Dave Fiore (#74)
 John Schmitt (#77)
 Wayne Chrebet (#3)
 Kyle Arrington (#24)

Playoff appearances

NCAA Division I-AA
The Pride appeared in the I-AA (FCS) playoffs five times, with an overall record of 2–5.

NCAA Division III
As the Flying Dutchmen, Hofstra made six appearances in the NCAA Division III football playoffs, with a combined record of 2–6.

Championships

Conference championships

References